Leopold "Leo" Lainer (born September 10, 1960) is a retired Austria international footballer who made more than 500 appearances in the Austrian Bundesliga.

He later worked in management and as a scout with FC Red Bull Salzburg.

His son Stefan Lainer is also a professional footballer.

Honours
 Austrian Football Bundesliga winner: 1983, 1987, 1988, 1989, 1990, 1994, 1995, 1997.
 Austrian Cup winner: 1983, 1984, 1985, 1987, 1989.
 UEFA Cup Winners' Cup finalist: 1985.
 UEFA Cup finalist: 1994.

References

1960 births
Living people
Austrian footballers
Austria international footballers
Austrian football managers
FC Red Bull Salzburg players
SK Rapid Wien players
Austrian Football Bundesliga players

Association football defenders
People from Zell am See
Footballers from Salzburg (state)
FC Swarovski Tirol players
Association football scouts